MV Bukoba was a Lake Victoria ferry that carried passengers and cargo along Tanzania's Lake Victoria between the Tanzanian ports of Bukoba and Mwanza City. MV Bukoba' was built in about 1979 and had capacity for 850 tons of cargo and 430 passengers.

The official deaths record is 894.

Sinking
The manifest for her final voyage showed 443 passengers in her first and second class cabins, but her cheaper third class accommodation had no manifest. Abu Ubaidah al-Banshiri, who was then second in command of al Qaeda, died in the disaster.

President Benjamin Mkapa declared three days of national mourning. Criminal charges were brought against nine Tanzania Railway Corporation officials, including the captain of the Bukoba and the manager of TRC's Marine Division.

Causes

Possible causes were identified by Captain Joseph Muguthi, formerly of the Kenya Navy, and writing in the pages of the Daily Nation'' as a marine navigation consultant. He labelled it an accident waiting to happen, as Lake Victoria ferries disregarded safety regulations. Specifically:
lack of life jackets, life belts, and lifeboats;
lack of fire fighting equipment;
lack of distress signals;
what equipment there is, is not regularly checked;
overload
the vessels are not regularly dry docked for routine maintenance and repairs;
the vessels are not regularly inspected;
the coxswains are not licensed to navigate.

More overarchingly, Muguthi blamed the incident on governments' marine departments being staffed by civil servants and politicians who have no understanding of ships and marine decisions.

The lack of equipment and divers were partially to blame for slowness in the salvage operation. Rescue teams from South Africa, including Navy divers, were flown in to salvage the ship and retrieve bodies.

Replacement
Replacement of the new ship is on construction at 89.7
bn/-, with the capacity of carrying around 1200 passengers, 20 vehicles and 400 tonnes of cargo.

See also
 Lake Victoria ferries
 2011 Zanzibar ferry sinking
 Sinking of the MV Nyerere

References

Ferries of Tanzania
Maritime incidents in Tanzania
Shipwrecks of Africa
Shipwrecks in lakes
Maritime incidents in 1996
Mwanza
1979 ships
1996 in Tanzania
May 1996 events
Lake Victoria
Passenger ships of Tanzania
1996 disasters in Tanzania